Al-As'ad ibn Muhadhdhab ibn Zakariyya ibn Kudama ibn Mina Sharaf al-Din Abu'l-Makarim ibn Sa'id ibn Abi'l-Malih ibn Mammati, better known simply by the family name Ibn Mammati, was an Egyptian official who served as head of the government departments under Saladin and his successor, al-Aziz Uthman, as well as being a noted poet and prolific writer.

Origin
Al-As'ad ibn Mammati hailed from a family of Coptic Christians from Asyut. He was born in 1149 in Egypt. His grandfather, Abu'l-Malih, entered the service of the then ruling Fatimid Caliphate and rose to become head secretary during the vizierate of Badr al-Jamali in the late 11th century. His father, Muhadhdhab, served as secretary of the army department under the last Fatimid caliphs, and continued in office under Saladin, until his death in 1182. Due to the anti-Christian policies imposed by Saladin's uncle, Shirkuh, Muhadhdhab and his family converted to Islam, as did a number of other Fatimid-era officials at the time, in order to preserve their positions. It is likely that this explains the family name 'Ibn Mammati', as the latter might be a corruption of the Coptic , 'Mohammedan'.

Life
He was a close friend and collaborator of Saladin's chief secretary, Qadi al-Fadil, but when the latter was replaced as vizier by Ibn Mammati's rival Safi al-Din Abdallah ibn Ali ibn Shukr, Ibn Mammati fell from favour. His property was confiscated, and he had to flee with his family to the court of al-Zahir, sultan of Aleppo. He died there in poverty on 29 November 1209, at the age of 62 Hijri years.

Works
Apart from his work as an administrator, Ibn Mammati is best known as a poet and writer. Qadi al-Fadil esteemed his eloquence and praised him as the "nightingale of councils". He is known to have written 23 works, but most have been lost. Chief among those were a biography of Saladin in verse, a verse version of the Kalīla wa-Dimna. Ibn Khallikan, in his famous biographical dictionary, reproduces some verses from a collection of his poetry, apparently compiled by Ibn Mammati's son. His most famous work today is the Kitāb Qawānīn al-Dawāwīn, a four-volume guide to Egypt, its settlements, agricultural and irrigation systems, industries, taxation, mint, weights and measures, and a wealth of other information valuable to modern historians.

Begun by Ibn Mammati, its stories circulated widely in Egypt, and were collected and rewritten by Abu'l-Fadl Abd al-Rahman al-Suyuti (1445–1505) and Abd al-Salam al-Malki (1564–1668), and proved so popular that in subsequent centuries, the memory of the historical Qaraqush was obliterated and his name became "a symbol of a lunatic tyrant".

References

Sources

Further reading
 
 

1149 births
1209 deaths
Scholars from the Ayyubid Sultanate
Saladin
12th-century Egyptian people
Sunni Muslims
12th-century Arabic poets
12th-century Arabic writers
Converts to Islam from Christianity
Egyptian people of Coptic descent